Daan Boerlage (born 7 August 1997) is a Dutch football player who plays for OFC Oostzaan in the Dutch Derde Divisie.

Club career
He made his professional debut in the Eerste Divisie for SC Cambuur on 28 January 2017 in a game against FC Dordrecht.

References

External links
 
 

1997 births
Living people
Dutch footballers
SC Cambuur players
Eerste Divisie players
Derde Divisie players
Association football midfielders
Sportspeople from Alkmaar
OFC Oostzaan players
Footballers from North Holland